A by-election was held for the New South Wales Legislative Assembly electorate of Liverpool Plains on 28 October 1911 because the Elections and Qualifications Committee declared that the election of John Perry at the by-election on 16 August 1911 was void. Perry had been declared as winning the seat, with a margin of 3 votes and 91 informal votes, and William Ashford challenged the result before the Elections and Qualifications Committee.

The Committee recounted the votes and held that Perry and Ashford had tied on 2,915 votes each. The provision for a tie only referred to the returning officer as having a casting vote, and he had already concluded his task in returning the writ. The Committee declared that the election was void.

Dates

Results

The Elections and Qualifications Committee declared the August by-election void.

See also
 Electoral results for the district of Liverpool Plains
List of New South Wales state by-elections

Notes

References

1911 elections in Australia
New South Wales state by-elections
1910s in New South Wales